This is a list of former employees of the professional wrestling promotion Global Force Wrestling. Global Force Wrestling was founded in 2014 but began holding events in 2015. All wrestlers listed competed in the original incarnation of GFW.

Alumni

Deceased individuals are indicated with a dagger (†).

See also
 Global Force Wrestling

References

External links 

Global Force Wrestling
Global Force Wrestling alumni